James Richard Wright (born November 22, 1958) is a former professional baseball pitcher. He pitched parts of five seasons in Major League Baseball (MLB).

Wright made his MLB debut for the Los Angeles Dodgers on July 28, 1982. In August 1983, the Dodgers traded Wright and Dave Stewart to the Texas Rangers for Rick Honeycutt. Wright pitched for the Rangers through 1986.

References

External links

Major League Baseball pitchers
Los Angeles Dodgers players
Texas Rangers players
San Antonio Dodgers players
Albuquerque Dukes players
Oklahoma City 89ers players
Denver Zephyrs players
Toledo Mud Hens players
Texas Longhorns baseball players
Baseball players from Texas
1958 births
Living people